Peter Hepplewhite is a British author. He is most well known for his Horrible Histories title The Awesome Egyptians which he co-authored with Terry Deary. However he has written many other children's history books, often co-writing with his longtime writing partner Neil Tonge.

Peter was born in Hartlepool in June 1954 and lived there until his teens. For the last 16 years he has lived in North Tyneside, and until recently he worked as the Education Officer at the Tyne & Wearwolf Archives.

References

1954 births
Living people
People from Hartlepool
British writers